Utah State Route 156 (SR-156) is a state highway in the U.S. state of Utah. Spanning just , it connects the city of Spanish Fork, via Main Street, with Interstate 15 on the north side of town.

Route description
State Route 156 starts on the south side of Spanish Fork at the intersection of Main Street and SR-198 (300 South, also the former alignment of US-6). From there, the route travels north along Main Street through the center of town for  until ending at an interchange with I-15 / US-6.

The entire route is listed as part of the National Highway System.

History
Utah State Route 1, ran through Spanish Fork, being designated as early as 1910, and was later known as U.S. Route 91. Its original alignment entered Spanish Fork from the south along Main Street, travelling north through the city until turning east on 800 North, then leaving the city northeasterly along Childs Road.

When this area of I-15 was completed in 1964, the state legislature realigned SR-1 to coincide with the interstate, so to "maintain continuity" in the state highway system, they redesignated portions of the old SR-1 as extensions of SR-26 (from Santaquin to Spanish Fork), SR-56 (from Spanish Fork to south Springville) and SR-8 (now known as US-89 from south Springville via Provo, Orem, Lindon, Pleasant Grove, and American Fork to the north Lehi interchange). In doing so, the southern terminus of SR-56 was moved south  to its current location, which at the time was an intersection with US-6. What was the original portion of the route was now a spur to connect the interstate, while the main alignment now turned east on 800 North to follow the former SR-1 along US-91. In 1992, because of safety problems at "Maggie's Bend", where SR-156 turned from 800 North onto Childs Road in eastern Spanish Fork, caused in part by superelevation of the curve, 800 North was given to the city and the state took over Childs Road, with the original northern end of the route that had served as a spur returned to the mainline, and the portion along Childs Road to Springville became a new state route, SR-51. The route has remained unchanged since.

Major intersections

References

156
 156
Spanish Fork, Utah
Streets in Utah